Peter Hobbs may refer to:
Peter Hobbs (actor) (1918–2011), American actor
Peter Hobbs (composer) (born 1970), New Zealand composer
Peter Hobbs (engineer) (1916–2008), British engineer
Peter Hobbs (novelist) (born 1973), British novelist
Peter V. Hobbs (1936–2005), British atmospheric scientist